Ojay Morgan (born 1987), better known as Zebra Katz, is a Berlin-based Jamaican-American rapper, producer and songwriter who has collaborated with artists including Busta Rhymes and Gorillaz. Fashion designer Rick Owens featured Zebra Katz's song "Ima Read" at his show at Paris Fashion Week in 2012. Morgan self-identifies as queer.

Musical style 
Throughout his career, Morgan has openly spoken out against the "queer rap" genre coined by Pitchfork and other publications used to classify Zebra Katz, and artists like Mykki Blanco and Le1f, while stating that if it weren't for his sexuality, he'd be generally classified as a "rapper".

Ima Read 
Despite not having a strong personal relationship with voguing, Morgan says the movement was pushed onto him as a means for creating context for "Ima Read". The connection between voguing and the track was fueled by the 20th anniversary of the ballroom scene documentary film Paris is Burning and popularization of voguing in 2012. That said, Morgan loves ballroom culture/voguing. He performed at the 2012 GMHC House of Latex Ball, supports House of Vogue founder, DJ MikeQ, and is a forming member of the House of Ladosha.

Less Is Moor 
Inspired by James Baldwin, Grace Jones, Nina Simone, and Little Richard, Zebra Katz's 2020 debut album, Less Is Moor pays homage to the minimalist approach often demanded from artists of color. Morgan clarifies this by saying that non-white people are commonly expected to be more resourceful than their white counterparts. With elements of hip-hop, drum 'n' bass, and electronic music, Less Is Moor is said to channel Katz's caustic lyricism into its biting rhythms.

The basis for the Less Is Moor album started while Morgan was studying at the New School's Eugene Lang College of Liberal Arts. His senior thesis project, "Moor Contradictions", was a performance featuring monologues and raps, including "Ima Read", from different personas created by Morgan. Among these characters is Zebra Katz, who Morgan says, was formed as a result of his thesis on identity obsession. Since then, Morgan has been fighting against the various boxes and typecasts created by those around him.

The title of the album is inspired by the Moor people.

Discography

Studio albums 
Notes

 All track titles are stylized in all uppercase letters.

Mixtapes 
 Champagne (2012)
 Drklng (2013)

EPs 
 Winter Titty (2012) 
 Tear the House Up: Remixes (2014) 
 1 Bad Bitch: Remixes (2014) 
 Nu Renegade (2015)

Singles 
 "Ima Read" (2013)
 "Tear the House Up" (2014) 
 "Hello Hi" (2016)
 "Blk & Wht" (2017)
 "In In In" (2019)
 "Lousy" (2019)
 "Ish" (2020)
 "Upp" (2020)

Guest appearances 
 Tanika – "Thoughts of Love" from Thoughts of Love (2013)
 Kura – "Our Sun" from Our Sun (2015)
 Gorillaz – "Sex Murder Party", "The Apprentice", and "Out of Body" from Humanz (2017)

References

External links 

 
 

Living people
1987 births
Date of birth missing (living people)
People from West Palm Beach, Florida
Eugene Lang College alumni
African-American rappers
American performance artists
Rappers from New York City
LGBT rappers
American LGBT musicians
LGBT African Americans
Queer musicians
Mad Decent artists
21st-century American rappers
Queer men
21st-century African-American musicians
20th-century African-American people